George Matthewson Thomson (19 October 1936 – July 2007) was a Scottish professional footballer who played for Heart of Midlothian, Everton and Brentford as a utility player. He was capped by Scotland at schoolboy and U23 levels and made two appearances for the Scottish League XI.

Career

Heart of Midlothian 
Thomson began his career with Edinburgh City and joined Scottish League club Heart of Midlothian in April 1953. He had to wait until February 1957 to make his debut, which came in a 1–1 First Division draw with Falkirk. He went on to make six further appearances during the 1956–57 season and was thereafter a regular in the team until his departure in November 1960. He was a fixture in Hearts' 1957–58 and 1959–60 First Division title-winning teams and featured as an ever-present in the latter triumph. He also played in both the 1958 and 1959 Scottish League Cup-winning campaigns. Thomson made 161 appearances and scored 17 goals during three-and-a-half years as a first team player at Hearts.

Everton 
Thomson and Hearts teammate Alex Young moved south to join English First Division club Everton in an £55,000 deal in November 1960. Thomson was unable to hold a regular place in the team during his two-and-a-half seasons with the club, but he managed to make 20 appearances during the club's championship-winning season in 1962–63. He made 77 appearances and scored one goal for the club before departing Goodison Park in late 1963.

Brentford 
Thomson joined newly-promoted Third Division club Brentford November 1963 and stayed at Griffin Park for four and a half years, before retiring at the end of the 1967–68 season. Thomson made 179 appearances and scored five goals for Brentford.

International and representative career 
Thomson represented Scotland at schoolboy and U23 level. While with Hearts, he made two appearances for the Scottish League XI against the Irish League XI.

Personal life 
Thomson attended Craiglockhart Primary School, Tynecastle High School and Slateford School. As a player, he was nicknamed "007", because of his looks.

Honours 
Heart of Midlothian
Scottish League First Division (2): 1957–58, 1959–60
 Scottish League Cup (2): 1958–59, 1959–60
 East of Scotland Shield (2): 1957–58, 1959–60

Everton

Football League First Division (1): 1962–63

Career statistics

References

1936 births
2007 deaths
Footballers from Edinburgh
Association football fullbacks
Association football wing halves
Scottish footballers
Edinburgh City F.C. (1928) players
Heart of Midlothian F.C. players
Everton F.C. players
Brentford F.C. players
Scottish Football League players
English Football League players
Scottish Football League representative players
Scotland under-23 international footballers
Scotland youth international footballers
People educated at Tynecastle High School